Zeyn Joukhadar is a Syrian American writer. Joukhadar is the recipient of the 2021 Stonewall Book Awards and the Lambda Literary Award for Transgender Fiction for The Thirty Names of Night.

Biography
Zeyn Joukhadar is nonbinary and uses he/him/they pronouns. He was born Jennifer Zeynab Maccani and his first novel was published under that name. Joukhadar has a PhD in Pathobiology from Brown University. Prior to pursuing writing full time, he worked as a biomedical research scientist.

Published works

Novels

Anthology (Fiction)

 
 Northington, Jenn; Williams, S. Zainab, eds. (2023). "Tiresias." Fit For the Gods. Vintage.

Anthology (Non-Fiction) 

Jahshan, Elias, ed. (2022). "Catching the Light: Reclaiming Opera as a Trans Arab." This Arab Is Queer. Saqi Books. ISBN  978-0863564789.
 Anappara, Deepa; Soomro, Taymour, eds. (2023). "On Queerness." Letters to a Writer of Colour. Vintage. ISBN  978-1529115840.

Honors and awards

Won

The Map of Salt and Stars 

 2018 Middle East Book Award - Youth Literature Award

The Thirty Names of Night 

 2021 Stonewall Book Awards - Barbara Gittings Literature Award
 2021 Lambda Literary Award - Transgender Fiction

Nominated

The Map of Salt and Stars 

 2018 Goodreads Choice Awards Finalist - Historical Fiction
 2018 Goodreads Choice Awards Semifinalist - Debut Author
 2019 Wilbur Smith Adventure Writing Prize shortlist - Best Published Novel

Short stories and essays 

 2015 Pushcart Prize - "We Will Tell Our Children," first published in Gulf Stream Literary Magazine
 2020 Pushcart Prize - "Incantations for Unsung Boys," first published in the Columbia Journal

References

Year of birth missing (living people)
Brown University alumni
21st-century American novelists
Stonewall Book Award winners
Lambda Literary Award winners
American LGBT people of Asian descent
American transgender writers
American non-binary writers